Carlton is a village in the civil parish of Carlton Town in the Richmondshire district of North Yorkshire, England. According to the 2011 Census it had a population of 232. Carlton Town, the formal name of the civil parish, distinguishes the parish from the adjacent civil parish of Carlton Highdale, historically part of the manor of Carlton. The village is in the Yorkshire Dales National Park, near the River Cover in Coverdale.

Carlton is the largest village in Coverdale and it has a public house, the Forester's Arms, and a village hall. It was also home to the "Coverdale Bard", Henry Constantine, and an 1861 inscription in his memory is above the entrance to Flatts Farm.

In 2011 the Forester's Arms was purchased by the local community.

To the east is the medieval motte of Carlton Castle.

See also
George Addy

References

External links

Villages in North Yorkshire
Coverdale (dale)